Mark Skutar (born March 15, 1994) is a Russian ice hockey defenceman. He is currently playing with Metallurg Novokuznetsk of the Kontinental Hockey League (KHL).

Skutar made his Kontinental Hockey League debut playing with Metallurg Novokuznetsk during the 2012–13 KHL season.

References

External links

1994 births
Living people
Admiral Vladivostok players
Kuznetskie Medvedi players
Metallurg Novokuznetsk players
HC Yugra players
Zauralie Kurgan players
Russian ice hockey defencemen
People from Novokuznetsk
Sportspeople from Kemerovo Oblast